Gink may refer to:

 Boob Fowler (1900–1988), American Major League Baseball player
 Harvey Hendrick (1897–1941), American American Major League Baseball player
 Hotel de Gink, a series of self-service American hotels created by and for homeless men, starting in 1913
 Wink Gink, a short-lived advertising character for Wink (soft drink)
 "GINK" ("green inclinations, no kids"), a variation of DINK (acronym), people who choose not to have children for environmental reasons

See also
 Captain Gincks, sometimes spelled Ginks, a privateer based in New York